Guadua is a Neotropical genus of thorny, clumping bamboo in the grass family, ranging from moderate to very large species.

Physically, Guadua angustifolia is noted for being the largest Neotropical bamboo. The genus is similar to Bambusa and is sometimes included in that genus. Several animals are, to a various extent, associated with stands of Guadua bamboo, for example several species of seedeaters, and the Amazon and Atlantic Bamboo Rats.

Distribution and habitats
The genus can be found in a wide range from northern Mexico and Trinidad to Uruguay, but most of the species are concentrated in the Amazon basin and the Orinoco basin. They usually grow at low altitudes (below 1,500 m), but has been found up to 2,500 m. Its habitats include lowland tropical and lower-montane forest, savannas, Cerrados, gallery forest, and disturbed inter-Andean valley vegetation.

Human use
From a utilitarian perspective, Guadua is the most important American bamboo. Due to its quality, the genus has been widely used for house construction along the inter-Andean rivers of Colombia and in coastal Ecuador.

Guadua angustifolia, endemic to Tropical America, is slowly becoming well known once again as a building material. Highly appreciated by Simon Bolivar for its watershed protection and praised by Alexander von Humboldt for its wide variety of uses, it is being used in construction today in South America.

Technical studies of bamboo's mechanical properties ("vegetable steel") have increased interest in its use. Although bamboo culms used for building can be harvested in natural forests, over-exploitation leads to the depletion of natural resources. For large-scale use of Guadua angustifolia, the management of sustainable bamboo forests and groves, as well as the establishment of new nurseries and plantations, is a priority.

Tropical bamboo can be propagated with cuttings or by covering complete culms with soil. The next year, new plants will sprout. Or, Guadua can be propagated more rapidly by the chusquin method. Under this method, culms are cut at ground level when harvesting causing many small shoots and new plants to grow around the original plant. This method is suitable for large-scale forests or farm cooperatives. Since bamboo is a grass, harvesting it down to the soil induces more new shoots to emerge, just like turf grass. This is a phenomenon not known in tropical hardwood forests.

Even more rapid methods have been recently developed through the use of tissue culture. Bamboo propagated in a laboratory in the space of one square meter will be sufficient to establish one hectare of new forest. These plants can also be readily transported in a one-half-cubic-meter box. Harvesting can begin six years after planting, making bamboo a potential source of tropical biomass production for industry (e.g., biofuels). For architectural purposes, Guadua is the preferred bamboo species. Its diameter is constant for the first 15 meters and then tapers at the top. These features have attracted the attention of civil engineers, architects, academics, designers, and artists.

Environmentally, Guadua is more effective at removing carbon dioxide from the atmosphere than most other tropical forest; ongoing studies in Colombia have now been coordinated by the Environmental Bamboo Foundation. On the basis of such studies, Japan and the Netherlands have both undertaken massive forestation projects as a way of earning so-called "carbon credits" to offset industrial pollution.

Recent studies conducted by the European Union indicate that bamboo has relatively low water requirements and that its root system is an excellent watershed protector. Depending on humidity, Guadua contains 15% more BTUs than other fuelwoods and could therefore serve as an alternative fuel for energy. German Fire Authorities tested Guadua and, guided by the European Building Code, approved bamboo as a building material for the Guadua Pavilion at Expo 2000 in Hanover. A preservation technique, involving the use of non-toxic smoke can prevent bamboo's deterioration for several decades. Bamboo construction is also earthquake-resistant. Recent earthquakes in Colombia's coffee zone demonstrated this when many houses built in the 1930s survived, while modern houses collapsed. Costa Rica reported similar experiences in earlier earthquakes there.

Species
Accepted species

Formerly included
see Arthrostylidium Aulonemia Bambusa Chusquea Eremocaulon Sphaerobambos

Gallery

References

External links
International Network for Bamboo and Rattan
Fundeguadua 
Torre Mirador (Sightseeing Tower). Tower made of Guadua, Coffee National Park, Colombia.
New Bamboo: Architecture and Design by Marcelo Villegas (Guadua bamboo)

 
Bambusoideae genera
Taxa named by Carl Sigismund Kunth